Datuk Syed Ahmad Alwee Alsree is the Group Executive Director of Cahya Mata Sarawak Berhad (CMSB). He is married to a daughter of Abdul Taib Mahmud where the latter is the Sarawak chief minister.

He was originally from Singapore but he has since moved to Kuching when he had earlier joined Cahya Mata Sarawak Berhad in February 2004 as Group General Manager – Human Resources. He was appointed as Group Executive Director of CMSB on 19 August 2008 following an earlier appointment as Deputy Group Managing Director in September 2006.

Syed Ahmad had worked with his brother-in-law Datuk Seri Sulaiman Abdul Rahman Taib. He is currently working with Mahmud Abu Bekir Taib, Sulaiman Taib's brother. He is now working as a director of Rashid Hussain Berhad (RHB Bank), CMS Trust Management Berhad and CMS Works International Ltd.

Syed Ahmad graduated with a Bachelor of Law (LL.B.) from the National University of Singapore, and practised law in Singapore for over 10 years prior to joining CMS Group.

Syed Ahmad received the honorary Panglima Jasa Negara (PJN) award which carries the title 'Datuk' from the Yang di-Pertuan Agong Tuanku Mizan Zainal Abidin in conjunction with His Majesty's birthday on 12 November 2009.

References

Living people
National University of Singapore alumni
Singaporean expatriates in Malaysia
20th-century Singaporean lawyers
Singaporean people of Malay descent
Singaporean people of Yemeni descent
People from Kuching
Year of birth missing (living people)